Cornwall Regional Hospital is a public hospital in Montego Bay, Jamaica, located in the Mount Salem district. It is the main hospital in western Jamaica.  The hospital is operated by the Western Regional Health Authority on behalf of the Ministry of Health, Jamaica.

History
The hospital was designed by The Architects Collaborative (TAC) of Cambridge, Massachusetts.  Construction of Cornwall Regional Hospital was completed in 1972, but the hospital was not opened to the public until May 10, 1974. Cornwall Regional Hospital serves approximately 18,000 outpatients and 73,000 emergency room visits per year. The hospital was named after Cornwall County, Jamaica, in which it is located.

Services
The services offered by the hospital include:

 Accident & Emergency (A&E)
 General Surgery
 Paediatrics
 Orthopaedics
 Obstretics & Gynaecology (O&G)
 Ear, Nose & Throat (ENT)
 Psychiatry
 Ophthalmology (Eye)
 Plastic and Re-Constructive Service
 Dermatology
 Critical Care (ICU)
 Urology
 Renal Dialysis
 Outpatient Clinics
 Medical Laboratory
 Radiation Oncology
 Radiotherapy
 Radiology (X-Ray)
 Pediatric Surgery
 Dietary
 Physiotherapy
 Pharmacy

Awards
 2013, Prime Minister's Trophy for the "Best Customer Service Entity – Single Location"

Notable people
Dr Ken Baugh, former surgeon and Senior Medical Officer

References 

Hospital buildings completed in 1972
Buildings and structures in Montego Bay
Hospitals in Jamaica